John Dewey Sanderson Jr. (August 14, 1927 – January 22, 2008), born "John Davis Sanderson", was an American Negro league shortstop in the 1940s.

A native of Galveston, Texas, Sanderson played for the Kansas City Monarchs in 1947. In nine recorded games, he posted six hits in 30 plate appearances. Sanderson died in Pasadena, California in 2008 at age 80.

References

External links
 and Seamheads

1927 births
2008 deaths
Kansas City Monarchs players
Baseball shortstops
Baseball players from Texas
Sportspeople from Galveston, Texas
20th-century African-American sportspeople
21st-century African-American people
Geneva Robins players